Air Chief Marshal Sir Edmund Cuthbert Hudleston,  (30 December 1908 – 14 December 1994) was a senior commander in the Royal Air Force.

RAF career
The son of the Rev Cuthbert Hudleston, sometime Archdeacon of Perth, Western Australia Hudleston was born in Kalgoorlie and educated at Guildford Grammar School in Western Australia, Hudleston joined the Royal Air Force in 1927. He served as an armament officer in India before attending the RAF Staff College, Andover in 1938. During World War II he served in various senior staff officer positions at RAF Middle East Command and Desert Air Force before being appointed Air Officer Commanding No. 84 Group in 1944.

After the war, Hudleston attended the Imperial Defence College before becoming Head of the UK Military Delegation to the Western European Union Military Staff's Committee in 1948 and Deputy Chief of Staff for Plans & Policy at Headquarters SHAPE in 1951. He was made Air Officer Commanding No. 3 Group in 1953 and then became an instructor at the Imperial Defence College in 1956 before being appointed Chief of Staff (Air) for Operation Musketeer, the operation to recover the Suez Canal. He went on to be Vice-Chief of the Air Staff in 1957, Air Officer Commanding-in-Chief at RAF Transport Command in 1962 and Commander of Allied Air Forces Central Europe in 1963. He is last appointment was as Deputy Commander-in-Chief, Allied Forces Central Europe in 1964 before retiring in 1967.

In retirement he became a Director at the Optical Division of Pilkington Brothers.

Family
In 1936 he married Nancye Davis; they had one son, Anthony, from whom three grandchildren, Marina, Nicholas & Valerie and one daughter, Sally from whom two grandchildren, Cecilia & Lucinda. Following the death of Nancye in 1980, he married Brenda Withrington. She died in 2020.

References

Further reading
 

|-

|-

|-

1908 births
1994 deaths
Military personnel from Western Australia
Australian Commanders of the Order of the British Empire
Australian Knights Grand Cross of the Order of the Bath
Commanders of the Legion of Merit
Commanders of the Order of the Crown (Belgium)
Graduates of the Royal Air Force College Cranwell
Grand Officers of the Order of Orange-Nassau
Officiers of the Légion d'honneur
People from Kalgoorlie
Recipients of the Croix de guerre (Belgium)
Recipients of the Croix de Guerre (France)
Royal Air Force air marshals of World War II
Royal Air Force cricketers
Graduates of the Royal College of Defence Studies